Netiv HaShayara (lit. Path of the Convoy) is a moshav in northern Israel. Located near Nahariya, it falls under the jurisdiction of Mateh Asher Regional Council.

History
The village was established in 1950 by immigrants from Iran and Iraq, on lands of the depopulated Palestinian village of al-Ghabisiyya.  It was originally named "Doveh" ("plenty"), and later named after the Yehiam convoy (Shayeret Yehiam), which tried to break into the besieged Yehiam during the 1948 Arab-Israeli War.

References

Iranian-Jewish culture in Israel
Iraqi-Jewish culture in Israel
Moshavim
Populated places established in 1950
Populated places in Northern District (Israel)
1950 establishments in Israel